Guntur-Rayagada Express runs between two holy Cities in Andhra Pradesh and Odisha.Earlier it was a passenger train and was converted to Express from 1 April 2018.

It was extended till Guntur from Nov 1, 2018. It was previously called as Vijayawada–Rayagada Express.

History

It was first introduced as Vijayawada-Vizianagaram Passenger. Later in Rail budget 1999–2000, it was extended to Rayagada. It was converted to Express train from 1 April 2018. Later it was extended till Guntur from Nov 1st, 2018

Coaches
It consists of Four Sleeper, Twelve Unreserved coaches and two guard cum luggage vans. The total composition is 18 coaches.

Loco
It is hauled by WAG-5 Electric loco of Vijayawada loco shed from Guntur to Rayagada.

References

Express trains in India
Transport in Guntur
Rail transport in Andhra Pradesh
Rail transport in Odisha